Katarki-Gudlanur is a panchayat village in the southern state of Karnataka, India. Administratively, Katarki-Gudlanur is under Koppal Taluka of Koppal District in Karnataka.  The village of Katarki-Gudlanur is 19 km by road south of the town of Koppal and 33 km by road east of Mundargi. Katarki-Gudlanur is on the north shore of the Tungabhadra Reservoir.

Divisions 
The Katharaki Gudlanur gram panchayat oversees three villages: Katarkigudlanur, Belur,  and Dombarhalli.

Demographics
As of 2010, the village of Katarki-Gudlanur had 4,685 inhabitants.

Notes 

Villages in Koppal district